Roberto Conti (23 April 1923 – 30 August 2006) was an Italian mathematician, who contributed to the theory of ordinary differential equations and the development of the comparison method.

Biography
Roberto Conti was born in Florence on 29 April 1923. He obtained his M.Sc. and Ph.D. in mathematics from the Scuola Normale Superiore di Pisa, under the supervision, respectively, of Leonida Tonelli (replaced, after his premature death, by Emilio Baiada) and Giovanni Sansone. Conti’s M.Sc. and Ph.D. dissertations dealt with translation surfaces (possibly a topic suggested by Tonelli after knowing about some Russian works) and particular aspects of the Cauchy problem. Later he held the position of research assistant to the chair of Sansone at the University of Florence. Their collaboration was fruitful and resulted in numerous articles, as well as the book (Sansone & Conti 1964), originally published in Italian, which was translated into a number of languages and became one of the standard texts on the subject in the 1960s. In 1956 Conti became full professor at the University of Catania, holding the chair of mathematical analysis until 1958, when he returned to Florence.  In 1963-1964 he held a visiting professorship at the Research Institute for Advanced Studies (RIAS) in Baltimore, Maryland.

His research focused on several topics, which often overlapped in the time and contributed to motivate each other. A leading theme was constituted by functional analysis and its applications to the theory of ordinary differential equations, dynamical systems and control systems. An impulse to do research on control systems was most probably given by his discussions with the Russian engineer and mathematician Nicolas Minorsky, who first proposed application of control theory to the automatic steering of ships. Minorsky, after the Russian revolution, moved to U.S. and later to southern France: during that period he came frequently to Florence, to give seminars and exchange mathematical ideas with Sansone and Conti. On another hand, Conti’s contributions to the development of the comparison method for the qualitative analysis of differential equations were particularly prominent.
He was a corresponding member of the Accademia dei Lincei since 1983 and a full member since 1994, a foreign honorary member of the Romanian Academy since 1997 and was also a member of the editorial board of the Journal of Differential Equations since its inception in 1964 until his death in 2006.

Selected works

Books and book chapters
, translated in English as 
.

.
.

Articles 
.
.
.
.

.

.
.
.
.
.

Notes

References

. The "Yearbook" of the renowned Italian scientific institution, including an historical sketch of its history, the list of all past and present members as well as a wealth of information about its academic and scientific activities.
.
.
.
.

External links

1923 births
2006 deaths
20th-century Italian mathematicians
Academic staff of the University of Catania
Academic staff of the University of Florence
Scientists from Florence
Members of the Lincean Academy
Honorary members of the Romanian Academy